North Side station is a station on Pittsburgh Regional Transit's light rail network, located in Pittsburgh, Pennsylvania. The stop serves the North Shore neighborhood and other adjacent  neighborhoods. Among the locations within walking distance are: PNC Park, the Pittsburgh Pirates baseball stadium; the Andy Warhol Museum; the Children's Museum of Pittsburgh; the National Aviary; and Allegheny Center.

North Side station and Gateway Center station lie at the northern and southern ends of the Allegheny River Tunnel, respectively.

References

External links 
 
 Port Authority North Shore Connector information
 North Side Station, North Shore Connector

Port Authority of Allegheny County stations
Railway stations in the United States opened in 2012
Railway stations located underground in Pennsylvania
Blue Line (Pittsburgh)
Red Line (Pittsburgh)
Silver Line (Pittsburgh)